Eurystomis castenaui is a species of beetle in the family Carabidae, the only species in the genus Eurystomis.

References

Pterostichinae